The Precisions was an American, Detroit-based, doo-wop/R&B vocal group of the 1960s. Their breakthrough single "If This Is Love (I'd Rather Be Lonely)," reached No. 26 in the R&B and No. 60 in the Billboard pop chart. This was followed up with "Instant Heartbreak" in March 1968. The band's members were Arthur Ashford, Michael Morgan, Billy Prince and Denis Gilmore.

"If This Is Love (I'd Rather Be Lonely)" is still played regularly on the Northern soul circuit.

Discography

Singles

References

American vocal groups
Doo-wop groups